"I Won't Last a Day Without You" is a song by the Carpenters with lyrics written by Paul Williams and music composed by Roger Nichols. It was released in the U.K. in September 1972, paired with "Goodbye to Love" as a double-A side. The single reached No. 9 and spent 14 weeks on the chart. It was later released in the U.S. and became a hit single for them in 1974, reaching No. 11 on the Billboard Hot 100 chart and number one on the easy listening chart.  It was the Carpenters' ninth No. 1 on the easy listening chart.

Background
In 1972, Richard Carpenter had learned of a new song by Williams and Nichols, who had already contributed "We've Only Just Begun" and "Rainy Days and Mondays" to the Carpenters. He included it on their 1972 album A Song for You, but it would not be released as a single until 1974.

Chart performance

Weekly charts

Year-end charts

Personnel
Karen Carpenterlead and backing vocals
Richard Carpenterbacking vocals, piano, Wurlitzer electric piano, orchestration
Joe Osbornbass guitar
Tony Pelusoelectric guitar
Hal Blainedrums
Louie Sheltonelectric guitar
Earl DumlerEnglish horn
Uncreditedtambourine

Other versions
Many artists have released other versions of "I Won't Last a Day Without You". Among the most notable are:  
Diana Ross included it on her 1973 album Touch Me in the Morning; she also made it  the B side of the title track single release, which became a No. 1 hit.
Paul Williams, on the 1972 album Life Goes On, and as a single in 1973, but his rendition garnered only minor success (US No. 106).
Maureen McGovern released it as a single in 1973 (and included it on her album The Morning After), reaching No. 89 Billboard, No. 72 Cash Box and No. 14 Adult Contemporary. In Canada, her version reached No. 12 AC. The Carpenters released their single the following year.
Al Wilson created a medley of "I Won't Last a Day Without You" with another Nichols/Williams composition "Let Me Be The One" for his 1974 album La La Peace Song. The medley was issued as a single in December 1974 and went to No. 18 on the R&B chart in Billboard magazine; it crossed over to both Billboard's Adult Contemporary chart (No. 39) and to the mainstream Pop chart the Billboard Hot 100 (No. 70).

See also
List of number-one adult contemporary singles of 1974 (U.S.)

References

External links
 

1973 singles
1974 singles
Songs written by Paul Williams (songwriter)
Songs written by Roger Nichols (songwriter)
Maureen McGovern songs
The Carpenters songs
Barbra Streisand songs
Andy Williams songs
Oricon International Singles Chart number-one singles
1973 songs
A&M Records singles